The Knickerbocker Gang (German: Die Knickerbocker-Bande) is a series of books for children by Austrian writer Thomas Brezina. It features stories about junior detectives called Axel, Poppi, Lilo and Dominik, who solve mysteries. The books, originally in German, have been translated to approximately nineteen different languages. The 1997 Austrian TV series Die Knickerbocker-Bande was based on the books.

A junior series, along with a 2017 adult novel entitled Knickerbocker 4 immer – Alte Geister Ruhen Unsanft, have been published. For selling over 25,000 copies of Die Knickerbockerbande 4Immer – Alte Geister ruhen unsanft, Brezina received the Platinbuch award.

Books 
Seventy-one books, not including the English language publications or the special editions, have been published in German. A junior series intended for readers between the ages of 7–8 years, Knickerbocker-Bande Junior, has been published in Austria.

Series novels

1. Rätsel um das Schneemonster
2. Ein UFO namens Amadeus
3. Lindwurmspuk vor Mitternacht
4. Wenn die Turmuhr 13 schlägt
5. Bodenseepiraten auf der Spur
6. Das Phantom der Schule
7. Die Tonne mit dem Totenkopf
8. Wo ist der Millionenstorch?
9. Treffpunkt Schauermühle
10. Der Fluch des schwarzen Ritters
11. Die Nacht der Weißwurst-Vampire
12. Schokolade des Schreckens
13. Der Ruf des Grusel-Kuckucks
14. Jagd auf den Hafenhai
15. Das Zombie-Schwert des Sultans
16. SOS vom Geisterschiff
17. Die Rache der roten Mumie
18. Kolumbus und die Killerkarpfen
19. Die Gruft des Baron Pizza
20. Insel der Ungeheuer
21. Frankensteins Wolkenkratzer
22. Der tätowierte Elefant
23. Die Drachen-Dschunke
24. Der weiße Gorilla
25. Der grüne Glöckner
26. Im Dschungel verschollen
27. Im Tal der Donnerechsen
28. Titanic, bitte melden!
29. Der eiskalte Troll
30. Im Reich des Geisterzaren
31. Der Bumerang des Bösen
32. Kennwort Giftkralle
33. Das Riff der Teufelsrochen
34. Das Geheimnis der gelben Kapuzen
35. Der Geisterreiter

36. Im Wald der Werwölfe
37. Die giftgelbe Geige
38. Das Haus der Höllensalamander
39. Das Biest im Moor
40. Die Maske mit den glühenden Augen
41. Die Hand aus der Tiefe
42. 13 blaue Katzen
43. Die rote Mumie kehrt zurück
44. Die Höhle der Säbelzahntiger
45. Der Mann ohne Gesicht
46. Hinter der verbotenen Tür
47. Das Phantom der Schule spukt weiter
48. Der unsichtbare Spieler
49. Es kam aus dem Eis
50. Der Schrei der goldenen Schlange
51. Der Schatz der letzten Drachen
52. Das Wesen aus der Teufelsschlucht
53. Das Diamantengesicht
54. Das Gold des Grafen Drakul
55. Der Taucher mit den Schlangenaugen
56. Das Geheimnis des Herrn Halloween
57. Das Internat der Geister
58. Der Computer-Dämon
59. Der Turm des Hexers
60. Das Amulett des Superstars
61. Wenn der Geisterhund heult
62. Das Mädchen aus der Pyramide
63. Spuk im Stadion (Der Fall mit dem 5. Mitglied der Knickerbockerbande)
64. Im Bann des Geisterpiraten 
65. Die Monstermaske der Lagune
66. Der Meister der Dunkelheit
67. Der Spinnenmagier
68. (Serie #2 2.) U-Bahn ins Geisterreich
69. (Serie #2 3.) Der Panther im Nebelwald 
70. (Knickerbocker4immer) Alte Geister ruhen unsanft
71. (Knickerbocker4immer) Schatten der Zukunft

Special editions

Jagd auf den 100 Milliarden Dollar Schatz (Zum 10jährigen Serienjubiläum)
Wenn der Eismensch erwacht (Knickerbocker 2000)
Das Kabinett des Dr. Horribilus (Neuauflage der bereits als Band 56 erschienene Geschichte "Das Geheimnis des Herrn Halloween" im Jahr 2007. Der Titel wurde geändert, um aktueller und dramatischer zu klingen.)
Das sprechende Grab (Buch zum Film)
Du entscheidest selbst, 1: Die Jagd nach Dr. Quallenstein
Du entscheidest selbst, 2: Das Vermächtnis der Frida Frankenfein
Du entscheidest selbst, 3: Das Geheimnis der Blauen Insel
Du entscheidest selbst, 4: Sieben Schlüssel zum Schlangenschloss
Gift für den Killerwal (14 Ratekrimis)
Wenn der Wolfsmann heult (12 Ratekrimis)
Die Gänsehaut-Orgel (15 Ratekrimis)
Pferdehof in Gefahr (12 Ratekrimis)
Die Geisterkatze zeigt die Krallen (16 Ratekrimis)
Unternehmen Wüstenwurm (12 Ratekrimis)
Es tanzen die Vampire (15 Ratekrimis)
Raub beim Ritterfest (13 Ratekrimis)
Schloss Schauerlich (13 Ratekrimis)
Der Schatz am Meeresgrund (15 Ratekrimis)
Wilddieben auf der Spur (16 Ratekrimis)
Geheimakte Y (5 Kurzgeschichten)
99 heiße Spuren
Neue heiße Spuren
Superheiße Spuren
Heiße Spuren für Meisterdetektive
Auf frischer Tat ertappt (Ratekrimis, erschien am 1. Mai 2009)
Das Geheimbuch für Detektive
Die Knickerbockerbande von A bis Z

English editions

Who is Robin Horror?
The Horror Diamond
Horror in Hollywood
Alice in Horrorland
Welcome to Horror Hotel

References

External links

 The Knickerbocker Gang official site

Series of children's books
Fictional Austrian people
Children's mystery novels
Austrian children's novels
1990s Austrian television series
German-language television shows